Leptodeuterocopus fortunatus is a moth of the family Pterophoridae that is known from Brazil.

Adults are on wing in December.

External links

Deuterocopinae
Moths described in 1921
Endemic fauna of Brazil
Moths of South America